The 2021 Aegean Sea boat capsizing took place on 24 December 2021. 16 people died in a boat capsizing in Aegean Sea.

References

Shipwrecks in the Aegean Sea
Shipwrecks of Greece
2021 in Greece
Maritime incidents in 2021